Delwin Fraser (born 11 July 1986) is a Guyanese professional footballer who plays as a forward for GFF Elite League club Guyana Defence Force and the Guyana national team.

Personal life 
Delwin's brother Delroy is also a footballer. They have played together for Guyana Defence Force.

Honours 
Guyana Defence Force
 GFF Elite League: 2016–17

References

External links 
 
 

1986 births
Living people
Sportspeople from Georgetown, Guyana
Guyanese footballers
Association football forwards
Guyana international footballers
Guyana Defence Force FC players